Hong Kong written Chinese (HKWC) is a local variety of Standard Chinese used in formal written communication in Hong Kong. While, like other varieties of Standard Chinese, it is largely based on Mandarin it differs from the mainland's national variety of Standard Chinese (Putonghua) in several aspects, for example that it is written in traditional characters, that its phonology is based on Cantonese, and that its lexicon has English and Cantonese influences.

Lexicon

Lexical differences between HWKC, Putonghua, and Guoyu 
Some lexical differences between the varieties of Standard Chinese in the mainland (Putonghua), Hong Kong, and Taiwan (Guoyu):

Semantic differences 
Some etymologies appear both in HWKC and Putonghua, but may differ in their semantic value:

Notes 

 In Singaporean Standard Chinese, 㤏 / 懂 dǒng also has the meaning of to know.

References 

Languages of Hong Kong
Mandarin Chinese
Chinese language
Cantonese culture